Ralf Georg Nils Gothóni (born 2 May 1946, Rauma) is a Finnish-German pianist and conductor. He is also active as a chamber musician, professor, composer, and author. Born in Rauma, Finland he made his orchestra debut at age 15. Besides his worldwide concert career he has made some 100 recordings with major labels. He often performs in a double role conducting from the keyboard.

Ralf Gothóni studied the piano from the age of five, first with Tapani Valsta and later with Ervin László. Gothóni mentions Sviatoslav Richter and Arthur Rubinstein as models for him.

One of the first landmarks in Gothóni's career was the 1977 Schubertiade in Helsinki: forty Finnish singers performed circa 450 lieder by Franz Schubert. Gothóni has appeared as a lied pianist with such singers as Jorma Hynninen, Martti Talvela, Arleen Augér, Edith Mathis, Anne Sofie von Otter, Ileana Cotrubas, Peter Schreier, and Barbara Hendricks. He appeared in lied concerts until the middle of the 1990s and since that has concentrated on solo and chamber concerts and orchestral conducting.

Gothóni was the artistic director of the Savonlinna Opera Festival from 1984 to 1987. He created the Forbidden City Music Festival in Beijing in 1996 and the "Musical Bridge Egypt–Finland" in 2007. He was professor of chamber music at the Hochschule für Musik Hanns Eisler in Berlin 1996–2000, the Sibelius Academy in Helsinki 1992–2007, the Hochschule für Musik in Hamburg 1986–1996 and 2006–2012 at the Instituto International da Camara, Reina Sofia, Madrid. Gothóni has made a significant contribution to the education of young musicians through Savonlinna Music Academy where he has served as artistic director. He was principal conductor of the English Chamber Orchestra from 2000 to 2009. Since 2004, he has been the guest conductor of the Deutsche Kammerakademie. In 2008 he was one of the jury members in the Sviatoslav Richter International Piano Competition  and in 2012 in the Paloma O'Shea International Piano Competition.

In the United States, Gothóni was music director of the Northwest Chamber Orchestra (Seattle) from 2002 until 2006. His initial appearance with the orchestra in 2001 was highly acclaimed and led to his appointment in Seattle. In 2006 he resigned in the context of financial pressures on the orchestra. The orchestra was later dissolved.

Gothóni's awards include the Finnish Pro Finlandia in 1990 and the Gilmore Artist Award in 1994. In 2012 he received the Queen Sofía College of Music award from Her Majesty Queen of Spain. He has recorded for various labels, including BIS, Decca, Deutsche Grammophon, EMI, Cpo and Ondine, such works as Benjamin Britten's Piano Concerto, Heitor Villa-Lobos' Choros XI, and the first and second piano concertos of Einojuhani Rautavaara. His writings include Luova hetki (The Creative Moment, 1998), "Pyöriikö kuu" ("Does the moon rotate", 2001), "Flyygelin kanssa" ("With the grand piano", 2004) and "Hämähäkki" ("The Spider", 2014). His compositions include three chamber operas, chamber concerto for viola and chamber ensemble ("Peregrina"), concerto for piano 4-hands and the cantata The Ox and its Shepherd.

Gothóni is married to the violist Suzan Saber.

References

External links
 Website of Ralf Gothóni
 Interview with Ralf Gothóni, June 30, 1995

Finnish pianists
German pianists
Finnish music educators
German music educators
Finnish classical pianists
German male conductors (music)
Finnish conductors (music)
1946 births
Living people
People from Rauma, Finland
21st-century German conductors (music)
21st-century classical pianists
21st-century German male musicians